The 2023 Córdoba Open was a men's tennis tournament played on outdoor clay courts. It was the 5th edition of the Córdoba Open, and part of the ATP Tour 250 series of the 2023 ATP Tour. It took place at the Estadio Mario Alberto Kempes in Córdoba, Argentina, from 4 until 12 February 2023.

Champions

Singles 

  Sebastián Báez def.  Federico Coria, 6–1, 3–6, 6–3

Doubles 

  Máximo González /  Andrés Molteni def.  Sadio Doumbia /  Fabien Reboul, 6–4, 6–4

Point and prize money

Point distribution

Prize money 

*per team

Singles main draw entrants

Seeds 

 1 Rankings are as of 30 January 2023.

Other entrants 
The following players received wildcards into the singles main draw:
  Tomás Barrios Vera
  Juan Manuel Cerúndolo
  Guido Pella

The following players received entry from the qualifying draw:
  Luciano Darderi 
  Federico Delbonis
  Hugo Dellien
  Andrea Vavassori

Withdrawals 
 Before the tournament
  Laslo Đere → replaced by  Juan Pablo Varillas
  Fabio Fognini → replaced by  Pablo Andújar
  Corentin Moutet → replaced by  Alejandro Tabilo
  Jaume Munar → replaced by  Hugo Gaston

Doubles main draw entrants

Seeds 

 1 Rankings are as of 30 January 2023.

Other entrants 
The following pairs received wildcards into the doubles main draw:
  Guido Andreozzi /  Guillermo Durán
  Nicolás Kicker /  Thiago Seyboth Wild

The following pairs received entry as alternates:
  Boris Arias /  Federico Zeballos
  Hernán Casanova /  Andrea Collarini

Withdrawals 
Before the tournament
  Pedro Cachín /  Francisco Cerúndolo  → replaced by  Boris Arias /  Federico Zeballos
  Albert Ramos Viñolas /  Bernabé Zapata Miralles → replaced by  Hernán Casanova /  Andrea Collarini

References

External links 
Official website

Córdoba Open
Córdoba Open
Córdoba Open
Cordoba Open